Roberto Cid Subervi and Gonçalo Oliveira were the defending champions but only Oliveira chose to defend his title, partnering Andrej Martin. Oliveira withdrew before the start of the tournament due to an injury.

Jeevan Nedunchezhiyan and Purav Raja won the title after defeating Nuno Borges and Francisco Cabral 7–6(7–5), 6–3 in the final.

Seeds

Draw

References

External links
 Main draw

Lisboa Belém Open - Men's Doubles
2021 Men's Doubles